Service with a Smile is a 1937 Fleischer Studios animated short film starring Betty Boop and Grampy.

Plot
Betty Boop runs the newly opened Hi-De-Ho-Tel, which has 40 rooms and only two baths. Guests have many complaints, ranging from a drawer shelf nailed into the wall apart from the rest of the drawer to pillowcases filled with cement bags and faulty beds with very short blankets. When they stress Betty out, she calls Grampy, who remedies the guests' complaints by making several complex contraptions.

References

External links
 Service with a Smile on Youtube.
 
 

1937 films
Betty Boop cartoons
1930s American animated films
1937 animated films
Paramount Pictures short films
Fleischer Studios short films
Short films directed by Dave Fleischer
American black-and-white films